Jakubauskas is a Lithuanian surname. Notable people with the surname include:

Chris Jakubauskas (born 1978), American baseball player
Feliksas Jakubauskas (born 1949), Lithuanian textile artist
Sigitas Jakubauskas (born 1958), Soviet Lithuanian footballer

Lithuanian-language surnames